Luis José de Orbegoso y Moncada-Galindo, de Burutarán y Morales (August 25, 1795 – February 5, 1847), an aristocratic Peruvian soldier and politician, served as the 5th President of Peru as well as the first President of North Peru. This was a time of profound social instability and continuing civil war which led his government to coexist with that of Pedro Pablo Bermúdez, and later with Felipe Santiago Salaverry.

Orbegoso was born in Chuquizongo, Huamachuco, on August 25, 1795. His parents were Justo de Orbegoso y Burutarán and Francisca Moncada-Galindo y Morales, 4th countess of Olmos. Orbegoso was therefore the 5th count of Olmos. He participated with José de San Martín in the war for independence and in the war against Gran Colombia during the government of José de La Mar. After the collapse of Agustín Gamarra's first government, Orbegoso was elected president in 1833, winning over Pedro Pablo Bermúdez, whom Gamarra had preferred as his successor.

During his government, he suffered the enmity of Gamarra, who while in exile had supported Bermúdez in his eventual presidency. Orbegoso had also to deal with the young Felipe Santiago Salaverry, who overthrew him 1835. Orbegoso, however, did not lose the support of southern Peru and, with the support of then President of Bolivia, Andrés de Santa Cruz, he regained his leadership throughout the country and executed Salaverry. In retribution to the support he received from Santa Cruz, he acceded to form the new Peru-Bolivian Confederacy. Santa Cruz assumed the "Supreme Protectorship" of the confederation and Orbegoso maintained only the presidency of the Republic of North Peru.

After being defeated by Gamarra's efforts to regain power with the support of Chile, Orbegoso had to abandon the country, returning later and staying away from an active political life. He died in Trujillo in 1847.

References

1795 births
1847 deaths
Peruvian people of Basque descent
Peruvian people of Spanish descent
Presidents of Peru
People of the War of the Confederation
Freemasons